Land reform in South Africa is the promise of "land restitution" to empower farm workers (who now have the opportunity to become farmers) and reduce inequality. This also refers to aspects such as, property, possibly white-owned businesses.  Proponents argue it will allow previously unemployed people to participate in the economy and better the country's economic growth. It also relates to restitution in the form of settling Land Claims of people who were forcefully removed from their homes in urban areas that were declared white, by the apartheid government's segregationist Group Areas Act: such areas include Sophiatown, Fietas, Cato Manor, District Six and Greyville; as well as restitution for people forcibly evicted from rural land because of apartheid policies.

However, many South Africans and foreign commentators have also voiced alarm over failures of the redistribution policy, having failed around 50% of land reform projects.

Details 

The Land Reform Process focused on three areas: restitution, land tenure reform and land redistribution. Restitution, the government compensating (monetary) individuals who had been forcefully removed, has been very unsuccessful, and the policy has now shifted to redistribution with secure land tenure. Land tenure reform is a system of recognizing people's right to own land and therefore control of the land.

Redistribution is the most important component of land reform in South Africa.  Initially, land was bought from its owners (willing seller) by the government (willing buyer) and redistributed, in order to maintain public confidence in the land market.

In 2000, the South African government decided to review and change the redistribution and tenure process to a more decentralised and area based planning process. The idea is to have local integrated development plans in 47 districts. That will hopefully mean more community participation and more redistribution taking place, but there are also various concerns and challenges with this system too.

They include the use of third parties, agents accredited by the state, and who are held accountable to the government. The result has been local land holding elites dominating the system in many of these areas. The government still hopes that with "improved identification and selection of beneficiaries, better planning of land and ultimately greater productivity of the land acquired..." the land reform process will begin moving faster.

As of early 2006, the ANC government announced that it will start expropriating the land, but according to the country's chief land claims commissioner, Tozi Gwanya, unlike in Zimbabwe, there will be compensation to those whose land is expropriated, "but it must be a just amount, not inflated sums."

In South Africa, the main model of land reforms implemented was based on the market-led agrarian reform (MLAR) approach. Within the MLAR, the strategic partnership (SP) model was implemented in seven claimant communities in Levubu in the Limpopo province. The SP model was implemented between 2005–2008 that ended up in a fiasco leading to creation of conflict between several interested parties.

On 1 September 2010, the National Rural Youth Service Corps (NARYSEC) was launched by the Department of Rural Development and Land Reform to provide and recruit rural youth specifically dependents of military veterans between the ages of 18 and 25 with skills development and to serve their communities by providing a 24-month training program at South African military bases.

On 20 December 2017, the ANC-led government announced at the 54th National Conference that it will seek to amend Section 25 of the South African Constitution regarding property rights to implement land expropriation without compensation (EWC). At the conference, a resolution was passed to grant ownership of traditional land to the respective communities, about 13% of the country, usually registered in trust like the Ingonyama Trust under the name of traditional leaders to the respective communities.

In February 2018, the Parliament of South Africa passed a motion to review the property ownership clause of the constitution, to allow for the expropriation of land, in the public interest, without compensation, which was widely supported within South Africa's ruling party on the grounds that the land was originally seized by whites without just compensation. South African officials claim that the land reforms will be different from Zimbabwe's land reforms in that South Africa's plan is "constitutional" and "subject to laws and the constitution," unlike Zimbabwe's process, which was overseen by Robert Mugabe. However, the process in Zimbabwe was also carried out by a constitutional amendment, signed into law on 12 September 2005, that nationalised farmland acquired through the "Fast Track" process and deprived original landowners of the right to challenge in court the government's decision to expropriate their land.

In August 2018, the South African government began the process of taking two white-owned farmlands by filing papers seeking to acquire the farms via eminent domain for one tenth of their estimated value, which, in one case, is based on possible value when the farm is developed into an eco-estate. According to a 2017 government audit, 72 percent of the nation's private farmland is owned by white people, who make up 9 percent of the population.

Future challenges
Various researchers have identified various challenges facing land and agrarian reform in South Africa.
 Willing seller-willing buyer principle: it takes a long time to negotiate land price with the current land owners;
 Claim disputes: it is a long process to mediate and resolve claim disputes (e.g. unresolved disputes between Makgoba Traditional Council and the Trust in the Limpopo Province, South Africa);
 Capacity: there is lack of institutional capacity for community legal entities (e.g. trust);
 Beneficiary selection: it is a lengthy process and time-consuming process to select the rightful beneficiaries for land redistribution;
 Resettlement support: it requires enough resources and time to effectively facilitate post-resettlement support to new land owners;
 Monitoring and evaluation: there is lack of reliable monitoring system and evaluation thereof;
 Policy: there are gaps in the current policies which compromise effective implementation of land reform programme.
 Different political views: there is lack of common consensus among political parties on land reform debate.

Unresolved land claims, which are largely rural claims, are mostly affected by a number of challenges such as:
 disputes with land owners on the validity of claims, land prices, settlement models and conditions;
 family or community dispute;
 conflict among traditional leaders, community, trust and beneficiaries
 boundaries disputes among traditional leaders;
 reluctance of other government departments and institutions to release state land;
 high land prices and disputes on land valuation;
 land price negotiations with current owners;
 lack of technical and financial support;
 mismanagement of resources;
 untraceable claimants; and
 land claim disputes resolution and mediation.

Financial and Fiscal Commission's 2016 report 
As of 2016, the South African government has pumped more than R60 billion into land reform projects since 1994. Despite this investment, the land reform program has not stimulated development in the targeted rural areas. A report by the South African Government's Financial and Fiscal Commission shows that land reform as a mechanism for agricultural development and job creation has failed. A survey by the commission in Limpopo province, KwaZulu-Natal and the Eastern Cape found that most land reform farms show little or no agricultural activity, the land reform beneficiaries earn little to no income and most of those beneficiaries seek work on surrounding commercial farms instead of actively farming their own land. If farming is taking place on land reform farms, these farms operate below their full agricultural potential and are mainly used for subsistence agriculture. On average, crop production had decreased by 79% since conversion to land reform. In the three provinces surveyed, job losses averaged 84%, with KwaZulu-Natal suffering a 94% job hemorrhage.

2019 reform
In October 2019, Parliament began discussing constitutional reforms that would permit the uncompensated seizure of private land. The ANC has laid out a commitment to land redistribution in its manifesto. The exact wording on the proposal is expected in March 2020. In February 2020 President Cyril Ramaphosa said the government intends to accelerate land redistribution in 2020. Ramaphosa indicated that land redistribution was important for redressing the injustice of the 1913 Natives Land Act.

Speaking from Addis Ababa, U.S. Secretary of State Mike Pompeo asserted on February 19, 2020, that land distribution without compensation would be disastrous for South Africa and its people.

See also
Land reforms by country
Agriculture in South Africa

External links
Rethinking the Past and Future of Land Reform, By Tembeka Ngcukaitobi, Anastasya Eliseeva, 19 November 2019

Notes

References

External links 
 Promised Land: New Documentary Follows Struggles Over Land in South Africa - video report by Democracy Now!

 http://onlinelibrary.wiley.com/enhanced/doi/10.1002/jid.3150

South Africa
Reform in South Africa